Christopher Porter (c.1801–1874) was an architect who was prominent in Geelong, Victoria in the late 1850s and 60s, and later in Brisbane, Queensland (now within Australia).

Porter migrated to Victoria with his family in 1851, worked as an architect in Geelong and then Brisbane, where he was appointed City Surveyor, and then turned to farming.

He designed:

 Bell & Son Bakery in Geelong
 Geelong Chamber of Commerce building in Moorabool Street  in 1858
 Ballarat Chamber of Commerce in 1859 
 Kedron Lodge in Brisbane 1860
 Normal School in Brisbane in 1860, becoming the Queensland Board of Education's first general architect
 Ballarat Benevolent Society in 1866

The Geelong Chamber of Commerce was built by Boynton and Conway, demolished  1955), described as ...a Barrabool freestone building of two storeys with an elaborate facade which included giant Corinthian order columns.

The design of the Normal School was later thought to have included a subtle joke with [A]ll doorways and windows had wide key stones and copings forming the shape of the dreaded broad arrow of convict days.

Porter also had an interest in a pottery and brickworks for the manufacture of tiles and hollow bricks at Mopoke Gully near Ballarat in the 1860s, which may have been connected to his contracting works.

He lived in his final years at Doughboy Creek (now in Hemmant), and died in 1874, and was buried in Tingalpa Church Cemetery. He lived in his final years at Doughboy Creek, and died in 1874, and was buried in Tingalpa Church Cemetery.

References

External links

1801 births
1874 deaths
People from Geelong
People from Brisbane
19th-century Australian architects
English emigrants to colonial Australia